The Grand Rapids Owls are a defunct professional ice hockey team, who were members of the International Hockey League from the 1977–1978 season to 1979–1980 season. The Owls were based in Grand Rapids, Michigan, and played their home games in Stadium Arena. The team started the 1977–1978 season as the Columbus Owls, but relocated to Grand Rapids on December 15, 1977. Their team colors were red, white, and black.

A "Junior B" team used the same name and logo until 2010.

Standings

References

Defunct ice hockey teams in the United States
International Hockey League (1945–2001) teams
Sports in Grand Rapids, Michigan
Ice hockey clubs established in 1977
Sports clubs disestablished in 1980
Professional ice hockey teams in Michigan
1977 establishments in Michigan
1980 disestablishments in Michigan

de:Grand Rapids Owls
fr:Owls de Grand Rapids